Emily Laverne Harding (October 10, 1905 – September 25, 1984) was an American animator and cartoonist.

Early life
Harding was born on October 10th, 1905 to Christians John B. Harding and Pearle W. Harding in Shreveport, Louisiana. Her family moved to Los Angeles in 1911. Harding attended the Chouinard Art Institute from 1930 to 1932.  She was a member of the Delta Kappa Sorority and attended at social events.

Career 
Harding, who worked for the Walter Lantz studio for much of her half-century career in animation, is among the earliest woman animators. She is also one of the few women to receive a Winsor McCay Award for lifetime achievement, one of the most prestigious awards in animation (only nine women have been recognized out of 161 awards given). She won this award in 1980.

Working for the Lantz studio from 1932 until 1960, Harding was particularly noted for her work on Woody Woodpecker cartoons; she designed the version of the character that was in use from 1950 to 1998. When Tex Avery offered her to go with him to Warner Bros. Cartoons, she refused. At first, she was a inker, but in 1934, she was ranked up to animator, and from 1940 to 1960, Harding was credited as such. From 1954 to 1955, Harding reunited with Avery to animate on his cartoons at Lantz.  While working for the Lantz studios, Harding also drew a humorous newspaper strip, Cynical Susie, for United Feature Syndicate from 1932 to 1934. Cynical Susie revolved around the exploits of the titular heroine (a dwarf woman) and her pet cow, Lily Whey. After leaving Lantz, she animated for Hanna-Barbera cartoons such as Yogi Bear. She later worked for DePatie-Freleng Enterprises on Pink Panther cartoons, and was briefly employed at Warner Bros. and Filmation as well.

Death
Harding died in her home on September 25, 1984 in Los Angeles.

References

External links 
 

1905 births
1984 deaths
American animators
Artists from Louisiana
American women animators
20th-century American women artists
Hanna-Barbera people
Warner Bros. Cartoons people
American comic strip cartoonists
American female comics artists